The Woodland Cree First Nation is a First Nation in Alberta, Canada adjacent to the Cadotte Lake in Northern Sunrise County northeast of the Town of Peace River. The hamlet of Cadotte Lake is located within the reserve.
 
As of September, 2010, there were 986 registered residents in Woodland Cree First Nation, 697 of which were living on reserve. The reserve covers a total of 16,106.0 hectares.

Woodland Cree First Nation was recognized by Canada on August 28, 1989. On August 20, 1991, WCFN signed a land entitlement treaty with Canada, and received three reserves.

Reserves

Notable members 
 Angelique Merasty (1924–1996), birchbark biting artist

See also 
First Nations in Alberta
List of Indian reserves in Alberta
List of First Nations peoples
Indian Act
List of Aboriginal communities in Canada

References

External links 

First Nations governments in Alberta
Cree governments
Northern Sunrise County